The Dodge Razor was a concept car created by American car manufacturer Dodge. It was introduced at the 2002 North American International Auto Show. The Razor was a partnership between Dodge and scooter manufacturer Razor, who were responsible for part of its design.

The Razor uses a 2.4 L Chrysler PowerTech turbocharged I4 engine with an intercooler. The Razor, a rear-wheel drive vehicle, uses a six-speed manual transmission.

Trivia
 Two orange Razor scooters are packaged inside the Dodge Razor, supposedly instead of a spare tire. The Razor was also equipped with essential tools.
There was a rumor that the Dodge Razor would have a production version coming out in the next few years called the Dodge Scooter. The Razor was believed to be priced at around US$14,500 (though this would have to be adjusted for inflation and additional safety requirement costs, given the time since the estimate). The Scooter would also borrow styling from the Dodge Copperhead concept car.

References
Dodge Razor Homepage @ Dodge.com
Dodge Razor at DaimlerChrysler
The Dodge Scooter-Possible New Vehicle

Razor
Collection of Walter P. Chrysler Museum